Zandabad (also Romanized as Zandābād; also known as Zandava and Zandāwa; ; formerly, Samadia (Azerbaijani: Səmədiyə)) is a village in Owch Hacha Rural District of the Central District of Ahar County, East Azerbaijan province, Iran.

At the 2006 census, its population was 1,104 in 224 households. The following census in 2011 counted 633 people in 166 households. The latest census in 2016 showed a population of 975 people in 298 households; it was the largest village in its rural district.

Etymology 
The village was originally called Samadia, but this name was changed to Zandabad by the proposal of the Iranian Academy and several khanate in 1936.

Economy 
The village's main export is cereal. People live on agriculture and cattle. Crafting kilim is also a common source of income.

Geography 
Samadia is a mountainous and temperate zone.

Demographics
The majority of the village's population are Azerbaijani.

Language 

Today, the predominant language spoken in Samadia is Azerbaijani Turkic, which belongs to the Turkic languages family. Azerbaijani is a member of Oghuz branch of Turkic language, and it is closely related to Turkish and Turkmeni. The modern Azerbaijani language is evolved from the Eastern Oghuz dialect of Western (Oghuz) Turkic, which spread to Southwestern Asia during medieval Turkic migrations and was heavily influenced by Persian and Arabic.

Religion 
The majority of the population are followers of Shia Islam.

Culture and art

Music 

The popular music is played by Ashik that play the Saz or Qopuz, a form of lute. Their songs are partly improvised around a common base.

Cuisine 

Some traditional Zandabad dishes are:

Ash is a soup prepared with bouillon, various vegetables, carrot, noodle and spices.

Dolma is a traditional Azerbaijani food. It is prepared with eggplant, capsicum, tomato or zucchini filled with a mixture of meat, split pea, onion and various spices.

Sights 
There are many sights in Samadia, including:

 Səmədiyə daşı, an epigraph
 Şeyvər mountain, the highest mountain in the village

References 

Ahar County

Populated places in East Azerbaijan Province

Populated places in Ahar County